Ruth Doggett Terzaghi (October 14, 1903 – March 3, 1992) was an American geologist and civil engineer. She held several teaching positions relating to both geology and engineering geology. In addition to pursuing her own research, she assisted her husband Karl Von Terzaghi in many of his geotechnical engineering and soil mechanics projects.

Early life 
Terzaghi was born on October 14, 1903 in Chicago, Illinois to Lewis and Grace Doggett. She had one brother and two sisters, all of whom gained their early education in both public and private schools. Terzaghi graduated from high school with a passion for the earth sciences, thus leading her to pursue a degree in geology and earth sciences at the University of Chicago.

Education 
Following her early years in Chicago’s public and private education sections, Terzaghi pursued a degree in geology and earth sciences at the University of Chicago. Once she graduated from the program in 1924, she continued at the institution in order to pursue an M.S in geology, which she claimed in 1925 with her thesis on the origin of abnormally steep dips in the Niagaran reefs of the Chicago region. She then received her Ph.D. in geology from Harvard in 1930, after studying at Radcliffe College, the female-coordinated liberal arts college for the then all-male Harvard College.

Academic career
While attaining her M.S. in geology from the University of Chicago and her Ph.D. in geology from Harvard, Terzaghi took on two additional positions as a professor of geology. The first of her role as a professor was at Goucher College from 1925-1926, and the second at Wellesley College from 1926-1928. Independent academic engagements and research pursuits excluded Terzaghi out of the educational profession for some time. It was not until 1957 that she assumed another professor position at the Graduate School of Engineering at Harvard. She taught as a professor of Engineering Geology, where she remained until 1961. She was then hired as a research fellow from 1963-1970, all while pursuing her own research and interests in the field of geology.

Scientific career
Terzaghi’s final contribution to geological research was published in 1965, and is characterized as her “best known” one by her memorial. A culmination of all her experiences and knowledge led to the creating of her paper titled “Sources of Error in Joint Surveys,” which appeared in Giotechnique.

Starting at the beginning, however, Terzaghi’s first mark on geological history was with her master’s thesis on the abnormal dips in the niagaran reefs near Chicago. She completed this thesis in 1925, but would continue to work on it throughout her academic career. It was through this continued research that she met her husband and lifelong scientific partner, Karl von Terzaghi, whom she married after receiving her Ph.D. in 1930.

Her husband had just taken on a role at the Technische Hochschule in Vienna, which sparked an eight-year worldwide geological expedition for the couple. From 1930-1938 they would investigate the conditions for several projects worldwide, all of which were laid out in her memorial from the Geological Society of America…Ruth traveled with Karl to investigate geological conditions for projects including a 600 ft arch dam in Sulak Canyon in Daghestan, Soviet Russia; a main irrigation canal through loess and broken limestone in central Asia; a rockfill dam in Bou Hanifia, Algeria; a concrete dam on clay sediments to great depth on the Svir River near Leningrad; and numerous foundations and landslides in Europe.Karl von Terzaghi is known as the “father of soil mechanics and geotechnical engineering”, so it is no surprise that his pursuits regarding the civil engineering applications of geological research would rub off on his new partner and wife. Following their return to the United States in 1939, Terzaghi assumed her role as a professor, then eventually research fellow, at Harvard. Her days at Harvard saw her cooperating with her husband on his projects, editing and critiquing them, as well as pursuing her own independent practice and research.

After she was agreed to look into the causes of deterioration on one of her husbands older projects, specifically concrete placed on a shipyard, she was published in two technical journals. She equated the deterioration to weathering, findings which impressed the publishers at the Proceedings of the American Concrete Institute and the Journal of the Boston Society of Civil Engineers.

Her research led to several more opportunities, including an investigation of deteriorating concrete by the Association of American Railroads, research into subsidence after being hired by a chemical plant, and investigating dams (incl. Hogback Dam in Connecticut and Necaxa Dam in Mexico) with her husband. Many of these opportunities took Terzaghi all over the country and world.

Terzaghi continued to pursue her research from her master’s thesis, which, following her initial discussion with Karl von Terzaghi in 1928, she discovered could be supplemented and reinforced by integrating the field of soil mechanics into her research. She published the final version in the Journal of Sedimentary Petrology in 1940.

Awards and honours 
Terzaghi’s publication in the Journal of the Boston Society of Civil Engineers led her to receive the Clemens Herschel Prize of that society in 1950.

Her paper titled “Sources of Error in Joint Surveys,” published in Giotechnique, paired with her outstanding scientific portfolio, earned her an honorary membership in the Association of Engineering Geologists. She was the first women ever to be recognized.

Her memorial highlights her inclusion into multiple geological societies… Ruth was elected to Fellowship in the Geological Society of America in 1948. She was a member of the American Concrete Institute and the Boston Society of Civil Engineers, of which she served as chairman of the Structural Section in 1954-1955.

Personal life 
Terzaghi met her husband, an Austrian geologist named Karl Von Terzaghi, in 1928. He was a professor of civil engineering at the Massachusetts Institute of Technology at the time. The two grew closer as he helped her develop her thesis for her masters in geology. They maintained correspondence after a brief dating phase, and kept their relationship even after Karl departed for Austria in 1929. They married each other in 1930, in absentia (i.e. when one member of the union is not present) by Cambridge. Once the arrangements were complete, Terzaghi departed for France to travel with her new husband. They reunited on June 7, thus embarking on their lifelong partnership in marriage and geological/ engineering research.

Their academic career began with a worldwide project campaign from 1930-1938. On September 5, 1936, Terzaghi gave birth to her first child, a boy whom they named Eric. Due to tensions regarding her husband’s work and the brewing war in Europe, Terzaghi returned to the US without her husband in 1938, so she could raise her son safely. Karl was obliged to stay, as a scandal in which a rival geologist attempted to discredit his work left him on damage control. As well, he was being scouted by the Austrian-German war effort for assistance.

Following the war, Terzaghi engaged in many collaborations with her husband, primarily taking on an editorial role, whilst also engaging in her own independent work.

In May 1941, they had their second child whom they named Margaret.

References

Works cited 
B. Peck, R (n.d). Memorial to Ruth Doggett Terzaghi 1903-1992. Retrieved February 11, 2021
Ogilvie, M., & Harvey, J. (2003, December 16). The biographical Dictionary of women in science:Pioneering lives from ancient times to the mid-20th century. Retrieved February 11, 2021
Rogers, J. David, (2013, May 1). Ralph Peck’s Circuitous Path to Professor of Foundation Engineering (1930-48) Retrieved February 11, 2021

1903 births
1992 deaths
Educators from Illinois
University of Chicago alumni
Goucher College faculty and staff
Wellesley College faculty
Radcliffe College alumni
20th-century American geologists
20th-century American women scientists
American women academics